Alternative Airplay is a record chart published by the music industry magazine Billboard that ranks the most-played songs on American modern rock radio stations. Introduced by Billboard in September 1988 and named Modern Rock Tracks until June 2009, it was initially compiled based on weighted reports from several national rock radio stations. Starting with the chart dated June 12, 1993, radio airplay data compiled by Nielsen Broadcast Data Systems – which electronically monitors various radio stations on a daily basis – was introduced as a factor in determining chart rankings. Modern Rock Tracks later became solely based on Nielsen data, a change that took effect with the chart dated January 22, 1994.

145 songs topped the Modern Rock Tracks chart in the 1990s; the first of these was "Blues from a Gun" by The Jesus and Mary Chain, which spent three weeks at number one from December 1989 to January 1990. The modern rock radio format experienced a substantial growth in popularity during the decade, with the success of Nirvana's 1991 song "Smells Like Teen Spirit" marking a "return of the crossover rock hit". Speaking to Billboard in 1994, chart analyst Max Tolkoff remarked that in previous years, "people didn't care what was a hit on modern rock. Now everybody wants to be involved." The first formal number one debut on the Modern Rock Tracks chart also occurred during the 1990s, with "What's the Frequency, Kenneth?" by R.E.M. entering at number one on the chart for the issue dated September 24, 1994.

The Irish band U2 scored the most number-one hits on Modern Rock Tracks during the decade, with six of their songs topping the chart: "The Fly", "Mysterious Ways", "One", "Hold Me, Thrill Me, Kiss Me, Kill Me", "Discothèque" and "Staring at the Sun". "Scar Tissue" by the American band Red Hot Chili Peppers topped the chart for sixteen consecutive weeks in 1999, the longest time spent at number one by any song during the 1990s. The band themselves spent a record twenty-seven weeks at number one on Modern Rock Tracks during the decade with four chart-toppers: "Give It Away", "Soul to Squeeze", "My Friends" and "Scar Tissue". "All the Small Things" by Blink-182 was the final Modern Rock Tracks number-one hit of the decade.

Number-one songs
Key
 – Billboard year-end number-one song
↑ – Return of a song to number one

Notes

References

Bibliography

External links
 Alternative Airplay at Billboard

1990
United States modern rock